Quilombo is a kind of hinterland settlement founded by slaves (or ex-slaves and their descendants) in Brazil; named from the Kimbundu term for warcamp.

Quilombo may also refer to:

Places
 Quilombo dos Palmares, a former Quilombo in Alagoas State, Brazil
 Quilombo, Santa Catarina, a city in Santa Catarina, Brazil
 Kakonda, a traditional independent kingdom in Angola

Rivers
 Quilombo River (Moji-Guaçu River tributary), a tributary of the Moji-Guaçu River in São Paulo State, Brazil
 Quilombo River (Juquiá River tributary), a tributary of the Juquiá River in São Paulo State, Brazil

Arts and entertainment
 Quilombo (film), a 1984 Brazilian film, directed by Carlos Diegues
¡Quilombo!, the debut album of Steroid Maximus
 "Quilombo", a song by Soulfly on their self-titled debut album

See also

 Military camp
 Quilombola, a resident of a Brazilian quilombo
 Chiasmocleis quilombola (C. quilombola), a species of frog from Brazil
 
 
 Battle camp (disambiguation)
 War camp (disambiguation)